Consumer education is the preparation of an individual to be capable of making informed decisions when it comes to purchasing products in a consumer culture. It generally covers various consumer goods and services, prices, what the consumer can expect, standard trade practices, etc. While consumer education can help consumers to make more informed decisions, some researchers have found that its effects can drop off over time, suggesting the need for continual education. New dimensions of consumer education are also beginning to emerge as people become more aware of the need for ethical consumerism and sustainable consumer behaviour in our increasingly globalized society.

Background 
Consumer education is an education that can be found in several areas of study in the formal school curriculum and incorporated knowledge from many disciplines, including: Economics, Game theory, Information theory, Law, Mathematics, and Psychology. The goal of teaching the subject is to help people understand in what ways we, as humans, traditionally make oversights in decision-making, so that we can be more self-aware and try to use that information to make more critical and useful decisions. It is especially important in a consumerist society, where many options are available, but rarely ever of equal quality, and where many options take advantage of our biases when we lack complete information, are in need of something urgently (like food while grocery shopping), our preference for familiar and common things, or when we have uneasy feelings. Training for teachers also include instruction regarding different branches of consumerism.

Consumer education focuses on both functional skills and rights. These two elements are inseparable in the sense that awareness of several rights leads to functional skills. There are also instances when consumer education is conducted for the purpose of changing consumer perceptions, such as the educational drive to increase consumer confidence in for example e-commerce.

Content
Traditionally, the subject matter taught in consumer education would be found under the label home economics. Beginning in the late 20th century, however, with the rise of consumerism, the need for an individual to manage a budget, make informed purchases, and save for the future have become paramount. The outcomes of consumer education include not only the improved understanding of consumer goods and services, but also increased awareness of the consumer's rights in the consumer market and better capability to take actions to improve consumer well-being.

Contents included in consumer education also vary from country to country. For instance, in the United Kingdom the focus is on the protection of children from the effects of exploitative consumer society, while in the Philippines the emphasis is more on issues related to the more immediate public interest (e.g., boiling water before drinking it, examining sugar for impurities).

See also 
 Consumerism
 Credit counseling
 Family and consumer science
 Financial education
 Financial literacy
 Ethical consumerism
 Sustainable consumption

References

Consumer